Sammons is a surname. Alternative spellings are Sammon, Salmon and Salmons.

Notable persons with that surname
 Albert Sammons, English violinist
 Angie Sammons, English journalist
 Ashley Sammons, English footballer
 Clint Sammons, American baseball player
 Greg Sammons, English rugby player
 Jeffrey L. Sammons, American literary scholar
 Jeffrey T. Sammons, American historian
 Mary F. Sammons, American CEO
 Michelle Sammons, South African tennis player
 Richard Sammons, American architect
 Sampson Sammons, American Revolutionary War officer
 Thomas Sammons (1762–1838), American politician

See also
 Salmon (surname)
 Salmons (surname)
 Sammon (surname)

English-language surnames